St. John's Evangelical Lutheran Church may refer to:

 St. John's Evangelical Lutheran Church (Corning, Missouri)
 St. John's Evangelical Lutheran Church (Passaic, New Jersey)
 St. John's Evangelical Lutheran Church (Livingston, New York)
 St. John's Evangelical Lutheran Church (Manhattan, New York)
 St. John's Evangelical Lutheran Church (Springfield, Ohio)
 St. John's Evangelical Lutheran Church (Stovertown, Ohio)
 St. John's Evangelical Lutheran Church (Culp, Pennsylvania)
 St. John's Evangelical Lutheran Church (Wharton, Texas)
 St. John's Evangelical Lutheran Church (Milwaukee, Wisconsin)
 St. John's Evangelical Lutheran Church (Dola, Ohio)

See also
 Saint John Evangelical Lutheran Church (New Fane, Wisconsin)